Johnnie L. Turner (born December 24, 1947) is an American attorney and politician serving as a member of the Kentucky Senate from the 29th district. Elected in November 2020, he assumed office on January 1, 2021.

Early life and education 
Turner was born in Bledsoe, Kentucky, in 1947. He earned a Bachelor of Science degree from Union College in 1974 and a Juris Doctor from the University of Kentucky College of Law in 1977.

Career 
From 1967 to 1969, Turner served as a medic in the United States Army. He later worked as an attorney for the Harlan County Public Schools. In addition to operated a private legal practice, he was also an attorney for the city of Cumberland, Kentucky. He was a candidate for the Kentucky House of Representatives in 2016 but withdrew before the election. Turner was elected to the Kentucky Senate in November 2020 and assumed office on January 1, 2021.

References 

1947 births
Living people
People from Harlan County, Kentucky
Union College (Kentucky) alumni
University of Kentucky College of Law alumni
Republican Party Kentucky state senators